Chainpur is an ancient town in Jaya Prithvi Municipality and headquarters of Bajhang District in the Seti Zone of north-western Nepal. The formerly Village Development Committee was merged to form new municipality from 18 May 2014. At the time of the 1991 Nepal census it had a population of 4,143 and had 759 houses in the village. It has a grass runway in town with limited flights. From 1990-2002 the Peace Corps operated in Chainpur.

Pop culture
Sydney Wignall's 'Prisoner in Red Tibet' and 'Spy on the Roof of the World': the story starts and finishes in Chainpur.

Media 
To Promote local culture Chainpur has two Community radio Station. one is jayaprithvi FM - 96.3  MHz and Bajhang FM.

References

Populated places in Bajhang District
Nepal municipalities established in 2014